See also Sam George

Samuel George (1795 – September 24, 1873) was an influential Onondaga Indian chief, holding the title Hononwirehdonh, or "Great Wolf" for twenty-three years. He served in the War of 1812 and was a renowned healer and orator among Indians and whites. Modern-day historian Laurence Hauptman describes George as an Iroquoian conservative who supported traditional Iroquoian ceremonies, language, and land rights, but also allowed missionaries and schools on the reservation.

Early life
George was born on the Buffalo Creek Reservation into the Wolf Clan of the Onondaga people. His physical appearance is described repeatedly in historical records, which historian Laurence Hauptman summarizes as a "thin, sinewy man with strongly marked features," conveying "athletic prowess and presence".  Accounts note that George was well known for his running abilities and was a  consistent victor in foot races.

Service in the War of 1812
George served on the American side during the War of 1812 in defense of the Niagara Frontier for at least three years, and was paid a $120 pension. During the war, George reportedly ran a round trip from American headquarters at Buffalo to the arsenal Canandaigua (a distance of 150 miles) in two days.

Hauptman notes a gap in historical information about George after the War of 1812 until the mid 1840s, when George and his wife and five children moved to Onondaga.

Years as chief
In 1850, George became a chief, "taking the name Hononwirehdonh, the 'Great Wolf', the hereditary keeper of the wampum held by a member of the Wolf Clan of the Onondaga Nation". In this role, George fought to restore traditional Indian government on the Allegany Reservation and Cattaraugus Reservation. At the time, state policies pursued a four-pronged "Americanization" agenda, including missionary activities, state-supported schooling, division of tribal lands to individual Indians, and awarding Indians U. S. citizenship in return for acceptance of the new land ownership arrangements.

George was a renowned orator who used his skill to influence the Iroquois Confederacy. He also frequently spoke at public events, where his speeches were translated into English. He was described by his contemporary, Episcopal minister William Beauchamp as "eloquent" and "full of official dignity" and "fond of storytelling".

During the American Civil War, more than three hundred Iroquois Indians joined the Union. George was the leading spokesman of the Iroquois to Washington at the time. By 1863, he was recognized as the "Principal Chief of the Six Nations" by federal officials, who also awarded him the honorary rank of brevet general. George met with President Abraham Lincoln in November 1863 to discuss Iroquois objections to the Enrollment Act, and convinced him to release Iroquois from duty who had not received the "bounties" owed them. (According to the Act,  men who did not want to enroll could pay someone else to enter the service in their place). George continued to negotiate for the discharge of underage Iroquois, as well as object to "conscription of Indians into military service without prior tribal consent," as was specified by historical precedent and treaties.

Healer
George served as a "traditional medicine man" for much of his life and in 1869 was appointed "government physician" to the Onondaga, and was formally licensed to practice medicine. Government official R. H. Gardner stated "I believe Captain George can doctor the Indians as well as a white man. After considerable experience on the subject, I believe that the Indians live under his treatment and are as healthful as when treated by any other physician".

Death
George served as chief of the Onondaga until his death on September 24, 1873. Although he never converted to Christianity and was buried according to Iroquois rites, Episcopal leaders delivered a sermon at his funeral.

Notes

References

Archival Materials
 Onondaga Nation Territory Collection, ca. 1845-1900 includes photograph of Sam George, Onondaga Historical Association Research Center, 321 Montgomery Street, Syracuse, NY 13202. Includes photograph of Samuel George (not online). 
 Samuel George papers, 1869-1872, Onondaga Historical Association Research Center, 321 Montgomery Street, Syracuse, NY 13202. Includes documents testifying as to his medical licensure and related petition (not online).

1795 births
1873 deaths
Onondaga people
Native American leaders
Native Americans in the War of 1812
Onondaga